Peter Whitmer Sr. (April 14, 1773 – August 12, 1854) was an early member of the Latter Day Saint movement, and father of the movement's second founding family.

Whitmer was born in Pennsylvania and married Mary Elsa Musselman. The Whitmers had eight children together: Christian, Jacob, John, David, Catherine, Peter Jr., Nancy, and Elizabeth Ann. In 1809, the family moved to Waterloo, New York, where they joined a German Reformed church and where Peter became a road overseer and school trustee. After 1827, they moved to Fayette.

In June 1829, Peter's sons and his son-in-law Hiram Page became witnesses to the golden plates. When the Church of Christ was organized on April 6, 1830, the Whitmers were among its first members. Their Fayette home is the traditional site of the church's organization (some place the organization at Manchester, New York). Oliver Cowdery, who had assisted Smith in the translation of the Book of Mormon from the golden plates, married Elizabeth Ann Whitmer in December 1832.

All surviving members of the Whitmer family broke with Smith in 1838 in Far West, Missouri, and were excommunicated from the church. Whitmer moved to Richmond, Missouri, where he lived until his death.

Notes

References
Keith W. Perkins, "True to the Book of Mormon—The Whitmers", Ensign, February 1989.

Richard Lloyd Anderson, "The Whitmers: A Family that Nourished the Church", Ensign, August 1979.

Cite

1773 births
1854 deaths
American Latter Day Saints
Converts to Mormonism
Doctrine and Covenants people
Leaders in the Church of Christ (Latter Day Saints)
People excommunicated by the Church of Christ (Latter Day Saints)
People from Fayette, New York
People from Richmond, Missouri
People from Waterloo, New York
Religious leaders from New York (state)
Whitmer family